Alena Mornštajnová (born 24 June 1963 in Valašské Meziříčí) is a Czech writer and translator.

Life and career
She attended Ostrava University, where she studied English and Czech. She has published a series of acclaimed novels, starting with her debut novel Slepá mapa (Blind Map, 2013) which was nominated for the 2014 Czech Book Prize. Subsequent works include Hotýlek (The Little Hotel, 2015), Hana (2017), and Tiché roky (Years of Silence, 2019). Hana is her most successful work to date and has been translated into English and several other languages. It was nominated for the 2021 EBRD Book Prize. She has also written a book for children, Strašidýlko stráša (Stráša the Little Ghost).

Mornštajnová lives in Valašské Meziříčí.

Novels
Hana, Translated from the Czech by Julia and Peter Sherwood, Parthian 2020.

References

1963 births
Living people
Czech writers
Czech translators
People from Valašské Meziříčí